Sirio Maccioni (5 April 1932 – 20 April 2020) was an Italian restaurateur and author known for opening Le Cirque.

Biography 
Maccioni got his start at Oscar's Delmonico, Delmonico's. Owner Oscar Tucci once stated, "Sirio and with Tony May will be some of the greatest restaurateurs that will come out of Delmonico's."
Maccioni was featured in Le Cirque: A Table In Heaven, a 2007 American documentary film.

He was awarded the Impresario dell’Anno (Entrepreneur of the Year) award at Affreschi Toscani. Maccioni was known for Le Cirque, his award-winning flagship French restaurant and other ventures in New York City, Las Vegas, the Dominican Republic, New Delhi and Abu Dhabi, which were run with his wife Egidiana “Egi” and sons Mario, Marco, and Mauro.

In June 2004, Maccioni published his autobiography, Sirio: The Story of My Life and Le Cirque with Bloomberg L.P.'s restaurant critic Peter Elliot. On television, he was featured as a guest judge on Top Chef, the 48th Annual Miss Universe Pageant and as himself in Charlie Rose, Behind Closed Doors and Eat This New York. Maccioni and his family were also featured in a behind-the-scenes documentary film Le Cirque: A Table in Heaven, which details Le Cirque's 2006 move from the Palace Hotel to the Bloomberg building on East 58th St. Maccioni and several recipes from his restaurants are featured in Egidiana Maccioni's The Maccioni Family Cookbook. In 2012, Sirio Maccioni authored A Table at Le Cirque with Pamela Fiori, published by Rizzoli.

Maccioni has been credited as the creator of pasta primavera, though that attribution has been challenged.

Personal life 
Maccioni was married to Egidiana Maccioni and the couple have three sons: Mario, a graduate of New York University, Marco, a graduate of Cornell University School of Hotel Administration, and Mauro, a graduate of Columbia University. He died at his home in Montecatini Terme, Italy, on 20 April 2020. His death was unrelated to the COVID-19 pandemic.

Restaurants

Over his career, Maccioni operated the following restaurants:
Le Cirque first opened at the Mayfair Regent Hotel in 1974.  It closed and reopened as Le Cirque 2000 at the Helmsley Palace Hotel in 1997.  The latest installation opened in 2006 in the Bloomberg Tower building at One Beacon Court (151 East 58th Street).
Le Cirque Las Vegas at Bellagio Hotel
 Le Cirque New Delhi (The Leela, New Delhi)
Le Cirque Cafe (58th St./Third Ave.)
The Beach Club by Le Cirque (Casa de Campo, Dominican Republic)
Circo New York (120 West 55th street, between Sixth & Seventh Aves.)
Circo Las Vegas at the Bellagio (hotel and casino)
Circo Abu Dhabi
Sirio Ristorante (The Aria Resort and Casino)
Sirio Ristorante at The Pierre Hotel

Awards

Impresario dell’ Anno (Entrepreneur of the Year) award at Affreschi Toscani  Tuscany.
1995 - Sirio Maccioni deemed a “Living Landmark” by the New York Landmarks Conservancy,
2000: Joe Baum Lifetime Achievement Award from The Food Allergy Initiative.
2002- Father of the Year, National Father's Day Committee
2003- Fine Dining Legend Winner Nation's Restaurant News
2007: Michelin Guide One-Star for Le Cirque in Las Vegas.
2012: Sirio Maccioni honored at Palm Beach Food & Wine Festival.
2013: Sirio Maccioni awarded First "Euro-Toques Italia International Award" by Eurotoques Italy association in Montecatini Terme.
2013: Sirio Maccioni and Family inducted into Esquire Magazine's 2013 Restaurant "Hall of Fame"
2013: Sirio Maccioni to receive "Pioneer Award" by The Best of Silver State Awards in Nevada.
2014: James Beard Foundation Award, Lifetime Achievement

References

External links
Le Cirque website
Circo website
Sirio Ristorante website
The Beach Club by Le Cirque

1932 births
2020 deaths
Italian restaurateurs
People from the Province of Pistoia
James Beard Foundation Award winners